Sredneye Bachmanovo (Ćojjyl, or Шöрöт Бачман, Šöröt Baćman) is a rural locality (a village) in Chazyovskoye Rural Settlement, Kosinsky District, Perm Krai, Russia. The population was 21 as of 2010. There is 1 street.

Geography 
Sredneye Bachmanovo is located 26 km southwest of Kosa (the district's administrative centre) by road. Bachmanovo is the nearest rural locality.

References 

Rural localities in Kosinsky District